Lumb may refer to

Places
Lumb, Edenfield, a village in Rossendale district, Lancashire, England; see List of United Kingdom locations: Lu-Ly
Lumb, Rawtenstall, a village in Rossendale district, Lancashire, England
Lumb, West Yorkshire, a village near Huddersfield, England; see List of United Kingdom locations: Lu-Ly

People
Edward Lumb (fl. 1872–1886), first class cricketer
Jane Lumb (1942–2008), British fashion model and actress
Jean B. Lumb, CM (1919–2002), Canadian activist
Margot Lumb (1912–1998, English professional squash player
Michael Lumb (footballer) (born 1988), Danish footballer
Michael Lumb (cricketer) (born 1980), English cricketer
Richard Lumb (born 1950), Yorkshire cricketer

See also